Yan Petrovych Morhovskyi (born 20 September 1998) is a Ukrainian professional footballer who plays as a left-back for Ukrainian club Polissya Zhytomyr.

References

External links
 
 

1998 births
Living people
Ukrainian footballers
Association football defenders
FC Podillya Khmelnytskyi players
FC Polissya Zhytomyr players
Ukrainian First League players
Ukrainian Second League players
Ukrainian Amateur Football Championship players
Sportspeople from Zhytomyr Oblast